Five ships of the Royal Navy have borne the name HMS Vixen, the term for a female Fox:

  was a 14-gun gun-brig launched in 1801 and sold in 1815.
  was a wood paddle sloop launched in 1841 and sold in 1862.
  was an armoured composite gunboat launched in 1865 and ordered to be broken up in 1895.
  was a V-class destroyer launched in 1943. She was transferred to the Royal Canadian Navy in 1944 and renamed . She was converted into a frigate in 1959 and was broken up in 1965.

Royal Navy ship names